Ship and boat building in Whitby was a staple part of the industry of Whitby, North Yorkshire, England between the 17th and 19th centuries. In 1792 and 1793, Whitby was the second largest ship-building port in England and Wales. Building continued throughout the 20th century but on a smaller scale both in terms of output and overall size of the vessels being built.

The position of the town, being geographically hard to reach due to the surrounding moorland, meant that until the coming of the railways, the town was largely reliant on the sea for imports and trade. Whitby was a safe haven from storms in the North Sea and was also a useful stop-off point for the resupply of ships. Given Whitby's status as a whaling port, and supply port, it developed a burgeoning ship and boat-building business that ranged from ocean-going barques, to small fishing cobles. One builder still exists in the town, Parkol Marine, which up to 2019, had constructed over 40 trawlers and other ships, mainly for the fishing industry along the Yorkshire Coast, and other businesses in the north-east of Scotland.

During the height of the ship and boat building industry in Whitby (the 1790s), the town was ranked as the third largest boat building centre after London and Newcastle. The town had at least 20 shipbuilders spread across different yards, though not all were in operation at the same time as each other. As some businesses went bankrupt, others assumed control of their yards, which led to some shipbuilders switching yards during the years of their operations.

Background
Throughout Whitby's early history, the town was a small collection of buildings clustered around the east cliff side of the present town, underneath the cliffs that held the church and abbey. The east side of the town developed as the fishing village, whereas the growth of the western side, was accelerated through the 18th and 19th centuries by the ship- and boat-building industries. Whitby has had a fishing fleet since at least the 14th century, but the growth in larger shipping both entering and being built in the harbour, was driven by the local alum industry that had several processing sites along the coast of Yorkshire. Alum was originally imported from Italy and was a monopoly industry for the Papacy, with one story suggesting that the supply was cut off during the Reformation. Another tale involved a way to get alum cheaper locally than by importing it at a vastly increased price from Italy. This story relates that Sir Thomas Chaloner visited the alum works owned by the Pope and recognised that the same rocks existed beneath his estate in Guisborough, North Yorkshire. He spirited away several of the Italian workers and set about his own alum business, which could produce alum at £40 cheaper (£12 instead of £52) than the imported Italian product. This led to Pope Clement III (term 1187-1191) excommunicating Chaloner and any others in the trade.

The alum industry in Whitby was started , and the river and harbour provided a good starting point for the outward transportation of alum and an appropriate receiving point for inward goods needed in the alum producing process, such as coal and human urine. Long before the alum trade, Whitby was noted as being a safe haven for shipping to wait out storms in the North Sea, and as a convenient stopping off point between the Humber and the Tees rivers.

18th century
The mass building of maritime vessels is recorded as having started around 1730, though this does not acknowledge the small-scale building of fishing cobles, which had been happening along the Yorkshire Coast for centuries beforehand. George Young attributes this to what was built before as being simply boats, whereas, after the early 18th century, the harbour was greatly enlarged which allowed ships to be built. The town had a fishing industry during this time, but it was a very small operation in comparison to the fishing fleets at Robin Hood's Bay and other ports on the Yorkshire Coast. However, until the expansion of the upper harbour at Whitby in the 1730s, fishing boats were built on the seaward side of the bridge straddling the upper and lower harbours. Also, vessels registered to the ports of London and Newcastle in 1626 are described as having been built in Whitby, with one ship, The Pelican, weighing , being constructed by Henry Potter and Christopher Bagwith.

But traces of shipbuilding can be found even further back; in 1301, the town was called upon to furnish a vessel for use against the Scots. Again in 1544, the town stated it would "provide ships for war", on condition that the harbour was repaired, and, in 1724, Daniel Defoe visited the town and claimed Whitby as a place "....where they build very good ships for the Coal Trade[sic], and many of them
too, which makes the Town[sic] rich."

Shipbuilding on an industrial scale seems to have commenced around 1717, when Jarvis Coates launched William and Jane, a three-masted vessel weighing . Coates had been in business since 1697, when his name first appears in a rate book. By 1706, the town was the sixth largest port in Britain, having over 130 vessels built in Whitby. A dry dock was uncovered underneath a car park on Church Street in the town during building works in 1998. The town had a plethora of dry docks for the maintenance of ships during the 18th and 19th centuries. The dry docks at Whitby were the first in the region, and only the second behind those in Portsmouth which were built between 1680 and 1700.

Whitby shipyards produced a significant proportion of the merchant ships built in England and Wales. In the period 1790 to 1793, their market share of new merchant vessels ranged between 10.1 per cent and 11.6 per cent of the total. In 1792 and 1793  Whitby was the second largest ship-building port in England and Wales. (London and Hull were the other large ship-building towns in the last decade of the eighteenth century.)

The most famous of the shipyards was that of Thomas Fishburn, who along with his business partner Thomas Brodrick, built many vessels, including the famous 'Whitby Cats'. Their yard built 88 ships between 1790 and 1815, making them easily the biggest yard in the town. The Cat was a particular type of vessel that was described as being "bluff in the bow and flat in the floors for maximum capacity". The ships were colliers, and transported coal from Newcastle to London and points between in the days before the railways. The Cat's shallow draught allowed them to beach and unload their cargo whilst stranded and be refloated come high tide.

The term 'Cat' could be seen as confusing, as at least two writers, Peter Moore and Karl Heinz, have identified differences between a 'Bark' and a 'Cat'. Three of Fishburn's vessels (Earl of Pembroke, Marquis of Granby and Marquis of Rockingham) were all purchased and renamed Endeavour, Resolution and Adventure. Resolution and Adventure were chosen by Cook himself when they were tied up in Whitby. All three had originated in Fishburn's yard, an impact that Moore states as being  Cook was known to be familiar with these ships, having served on board several cats and barks as part of his apprenticeship during his early days in Whitby.

The shipbuilding industry led to many other industries in the town such as rope-making and sail making. Two roperies were on the eastern bank, and three others on the western bank of the river. This was used up until just after the First World War. At least four sailmakers were located in the town (usually in buildings known as sail lofts.) Whilst most of these were located on the side of the shipyards or the water, one, owned by Campion was situated in the upper part of Bagdale and produced a special type of sailcloth which did not use starch in its preparation as most other manufacturers did. The yardage of cloth produced in the late 1770s was about  annually, of which, most was supplied to the Royal Navy in London.

Timber yards were also one of the main functions of the town before the use of iron and steel in shipbuilding. Timber, hemp, flax and tar were all needed for the shipbuilding industry, and many of these came from the Baltic States via ships. But as the Gulf of Riga traditionally froze over winter, many  Whitby ships were in for repair, which led to an increase in the number of dry docks in the harbour area. The winter work that was carried out on the vessels was a lucrative sideline to the shipbuilders, as in the latter part of the 17th century, this brought in around £2,200 to the port every year. This sum can be compared with the wages earned over one year for a captain of a ship (£131) and an able seaman (£43).

Timber was originally sourced from Yorkshire, probably from the Vale of Pickering area, and it required a good number of oak trees per each ship built. Marquis of Granby (later HMS Resolution), was estimated to have been constructed from at least 200 mature oaks. As Whitby was isolated from the rest of Yorkshire by its surrounding moorland, transportation of the oaks was problematic as it took an old route over Lockton High Moor. It is believed that the 1759 act to provide a turnpike between Pickering and Whitby, was in part down to the necessity of transporting wood from the Pickering area to the Whitby Shipyards. The route still exists today as the A169 road. Timber was later also imported from Hull and other English ports.

During the 1790s, the ship- and boat-building industry in Whitby was at its zenith, with almost  of shipping launched in the year from 1790 to 1791. This made Whitby the third largest producer of shipping in Britain after London and Newcastle, with Hull, Liverpool, Yarmouth, Whitehaven and Bristol, being less productive than Whitby.

19th century
A peace treaty signed between the warring parties at the cessation of the Napoleonic Wars created a decline in the shipbuilding industry in Whitby; however, by the 1830s, shipbuilding was on the increase again.

In 1870, the yard of Turnbull and Son switched to constructing ships made of iron instead of wood. A year later in 1871, Turnbull's launched the first Whitby-built steamship, SS Whitehall. The number of ships and overall tonnage grew steadily and provided a keen income to the yard. This saw their workforce decimated from nearly 800 men to just 70. Turnbull and Son launched their last vessel, SS Broomfield in 1902, which brought an end to the great shipbuilding in Whitby as Turnbull and son were the last "significant shipbuilders". Another cause for the loss of the shipbuilding business was that by the turn of the 20th century, steel and iron were the materials that ships were mostly made from, and Whitby could not compete with shipyards on the Tyne, Tees and Humber rivers who had a plentiful supply of metals on their doorstep.

20th century
Other than an occasional or small boat build, ship and boat building disappeared from Whitby, though the widened 1909 swing bridge ironically allowed captured enemy ships from the First World War to be brought into the upper harbour and scrapped. Boats of that size, typically , would not have been able to reach the upper harbour through the old bridge. Also during the First World War, the former Turnbull shipyard was sold to the Albion Trust who were hoping for a resurgence in shipbuilding at Whitby to support the war effort. In 1917, two ferro-concrete vessels were launched from Whitby, but no further building was undertaken.

Boat building on a regular basis returned to Whitby in the late 1990s, when Parkol Marine Engineering, an established repair and engineering business, started constructing small fishing vessels such as trawlers and seine craft.

Many of the shipyards on the western bank of the River Esk have been lost, first under the railway, and during the latter half of the twentieth century, to a supermarket and marina development.

Builders

The table below gives descriptions of the various ship and boat builders known to have existed in Whitby, though the list is not exhaustive. The image shows the relative timelines of each company, though it should be remembered that shipbuilding largely ended in 1902, but that Smales still existed as a company until the 1940s as a repair yard. Similarly, Parkol Marine started up in 1980, but did not start building boats until the late 1990s. Some yards possibly also diversified into ship breaking, with one breakers known as Clarkson's operating between 1919 and 1921, though it is unknown if this is the same family who went on to make cobles between the 1930s and the 1970s.

Some of the concerns listed amalgamated or took on partners for certain jobs; these are listed if it is specific enough to warrant that information.

In addition to the above, minor concerns that were in business for a short time (typically less than three years) were; Jonathan Lacey (1800–1803), Reynolds & Co. (1790) and William Simpson (1760).

Ships
Whilst the list below is not exhaustive, it does cover some of the more notable ships to have been built in Whitby. Years in brackets are when the vessel was launched.

 Earl of Pembroke (1764), became  in 1768 after being bought by the Admiralty
 Marquis of Granby (1770), became  in 1771 after being bought by the Admiralty
 Marquis of Rockingham (1770), which became  in 1771 after being bought by the Admiralty 
 Dilligence (1774), became  in 1774 after being bought by the Admiralty
 Chapman (1777)
 Fishburn (1780)
 Ann and Amelia (1781)
 Sylph (1791)
 Hannah (1793)
 Ceres (1794)
 Coverdale (1795)
 Cambridge (1797)
 Herald (1799), became  in 1803 after being bought by the Admiralty 
 Diadem (1800)
 Paragon (1800)
 Majestic (1801)
 Cullands Grove (1802)
 Majestic (1804)
 Kingston (1806)
 Mariner (1807)
 Aurora (1808)
 Ocean (1808)
 Hyperion (1810)
 Atlas (1811)
 Asia (1813)
 Regret (1814)
 Skelton (1818)
 Hercules (1822)
 Timandra (1822)
 Lotus (1826)
 Isabella (1827)
 Whitby (1837)
 Rosebud (1841)

Gallery

See also
Prospect of Whitby - a pub on the River Thames in London. Said to be so named after a ship regularly berthed there carrying coal from Newcastle, but the ship was built in, and named after, Whitby. An area of Whitby to the south west of the town is known as Prospect Hill and was a viewpoint that offered travellers and sailors an extensive and commanding view of the harbour and the sea. The ship Prospect of Whitby was said to have been named after this area.

Notes

References

Sources

External links

Shipping page on Whitby Museum website
Ann Brassey's detailed account of the rescue of the crew of The Monkshaven
Plan of the Earl of Pembroke

1717 establishments in England
Shipyards of England
 
English shipbuilders
Economy of North Yorkshire